The chapters of World Embryo are written and illustrated by Daisuke Moriyama and have been serialized in Young King OURs from 2005 to 2014. The series follows Riku Amami who finds himself caught in the conflict between kanshu, monsters that use cell phone signals to reproduce and travel, and F.L.A.G., an organization of warriors who wield Jinki weapons designed to fight kanshu.

Since its premiere, over 100 chapters had been released in Japan. Shōnen Gahosha is publishing the individual chapters in tankōbon volumes, with thirteen released in Japan. The series is licensed for an English language release in Singapore by Chuang Yi, in Australia by Madman Entertainment, and in North America by Dark Horse Comics. In Europe, the series is licensed in Italy by J-POP Edizioni, and in France by Kazé Manga (formerly Asuka).



List of chapters and volumes

References

World Embryo